Climate change in New Hampshire encompasses the effects of climate change, attributed to man-made increases in atmospheric carbon dioxide, in the U.S. state of New Hampshire.

The United States Environmental Protection Agency reports:

Increasing temperature and changing precipitation patterns

"Rising temperatures and shifting rainfall patterns are likely to increase the intensity of both floods and droughts. Average annual precipitation in the Northeast increased 10 percent from 1895 to 2011, and precipitation from extremely heavy storms has increased 70 percent since 1958. During the next century, average annual precipitation and the frequency of heavy downpours are likely to keep rising. Average precipitation is likely to increase during winter and spring, but not change significantly during summer and fall. Rising temperatures will melt snow earlier in spring and increase evaporation, and thereby dry the soil during summer and fall. So flooding is likely to be worse during winter and spring, and droughts worse during summer and fall".

Winter recreation

It has been reported that New England winters are in decline due to climate change. "Warmer winters may bring more rain and less snow to New Hampshire. A decline in snowfall would shorten the season during which the ground is covered with snow, which could harm recreational industries like skiing, snowboarding, and snowmobiling, and the local economies that depend on them".

Agriculture
"Climate change may pose challenges for agriculture. Some farms may be harmed if more hot days and droughts reduce crop yields, or if more flooding and wetter springs delay their planting dates. Other farms may benefit from a longer growing season and the fertilizing effect of carbon dioxide".

Sea level rise, wetland loss, and coastal flooding

"Rising sea level erodes wetlands and beaches and increases damage from coastal storms. Tidal wetlands are inherently vulnerable because of their low elevations, and shoreline development prevents them from migrating inland onto higher ground. Human activities such as filling wetlands have destroyed about one third of New England’s coastal wetlands since the early 1800s. Wetlands provide habitat for many bird species, such as osprey and heron, as well as several fish species. Losing coastal wetlands would harm coastal ecosystems and remove an important line of defense against coastal flooding. Coastal cities and towns will become more vulnerable to storms in the coming century as sea level rises, shorelines erode, and storm surges become higher. Storms can destroy coastal homes, wash out highways and rail lines, and damage essential communication, energy, and wastewater management infrastructure".

Ecosystems

"Changing the climate threatens ecosystems by disrupting relationships between species. Wildflowers and woody perennials are blooming—and migratory birds are arriving—sooner in spring. Not all species adjust in the same way, however, so the food that one species needs may no longer be available when that species arrives on its migration. Rising temperatures allow deer populations to increase, reducing forest underbrush, which makes some animals more vulnerable to predators".

"Climate change can allow invasive species to expand their ranges. For example, the hemlock woolly adelgid has infested hemlock trees in southern New Hampshire. Infestation eventually kills almost all hemlock trees, which are replaced by black oaks, black birch, and other hardwoods. Warmer temperatures are likely to enable the woolly adelgid to expand northward. The loss of hemlock trees would remove the primary habitat for the blue-headed vireo and Blackburnian warbler. It could also change stream temperatures and cause streams to run dry more often, harming brook trout and brown trout.

See also
 Plug-in electric vehicles in New Hampshire

References

Further reading

 —this chapter of the National Climate Assessment covers Northeast states

New Hampshire